Diastema cnossia is a species of moth in the family Noctuidae (the owlet moths).

The MONA or Hodges number for Diastema cnossia is 9068.

References

Further reading

 
 
 

Condicinae
Articles created by Qbugbot
Moths described in 1889